Lontano, Italian for distant or away, may refer to:

 Lontano (album) or the title tracks, by Tomasz Stańko, 2005
 "Lontano" (song), by Francesca Michielin, 2015
 Lontano, a 1967 orchestral composition by György Ligeti
 "Lontano, lontano", a duet from the 1875 opera Mefistofele by Boito
 Lontano Ensemble, a London-based contemporary music ensemble co-founded in 1976 by Odaline de la Martinez
 Lontano, a 2015 novel by Jean-Christophe Grange